Excitatory amino acid transporter 1 (EAAT1) is a protein that, in humans, is encoded by the SLC1A3 gene.  EAAT1 is also often called the GLutamate ASpartate Transporter 1 (GLAST-1).

EAAT1 is predominantly expressed in the plasma membrane, allowing it to remove glutamate from the extracellular space.  It has also been localized in the inner mitochondrial membrane as part of the malate-aspartate shuttle.

Mechanism 

EAAT1 functions in vivo as a homotrimer.  EAAT1 mediates the transport of glutamic and aspartic acid with the cotransport of three Na+ and one H+ cations and counter transport of one K+ cation.  This co-transport coupling (or symport) allows the transport of glutamate into cells against a concentration gradient.

Tissue distribution 

EAAT1 is expressed throughout the CNS, and is highly expressed in astrocytes and Bergmann glia in the cerebellum. In the retina, EAAT1 is expressed in Muller cells.  EAAT1 is also expressed in a number of other tissues including cardiac myocytes.

Clinical significance
It is associated with type 6 episodic ataxia. EAAT1 expression may also be associated with osteoarthritis.

Pharmacology
DL-threo-beta-benzyloxyaspartate (TBOA) is an inhibitor of the excitatory amino acid transporters.

Selective inhibitors for EAAT1 have recently been discovered based on 25 combinations of substitutions at the 4 and 7 positions of 2-amino-5-oxo-5,6,7,8-tetrahydro-4H-chromene-3-carbonitril.

References

Further reading

External links 
 
 

Solute carrier family
Neurotransmitter transporters
Glutamate (neurotransmitter)